Henry Graves may refer to:

Henry Graves (banker) (1868–1953), American banker and art collector
Henry Graves (printseller and publisher) (1806–1892), British printseller and publisher
Henry Lee Graves (1813–1881), president of Baylor University
Henry Richard Graves (1818–1882), English portrait painter
Henry S. Graves (1871–1951), American conservationist and co-founder of the Yale School of Forestry
Henry Cyril Percy Graves, 5th Baron Graves (1847–1914), one of the Barons Graves
Henry Algernon Claude Graves, 7th Baron Graves (1877–1963), one of the Barons Graves